Trapezites maheta, the Maheta skipper or northern silver ochre, is a butterfly of the family Hesperiidae. It is found in Australia in Queensland and northern New South Wales.

The wingspan is about 30 mm.

The larvae feed on Lomandra hystrix and Lomandra multiflora.

External links
 Australian Caterpillars

Trapezitinae
Butterflies described in 1877
Butterflies of Australia
Taxa named by William Chapman Hewitson